Kabir Khan may refer to:

 Kabir Khan (director) (born 1971), Indian director, screenwriter, and camera operator
 Kabir Khan (cricketer) (born 1974), Pakistani cricketer